Sabiñánigo (Samianigo in Aragonese) is a municipality located in the province of Huesca, Aragón, Spain, capital of the comarca of Alto Gállego. Formerly, the region was called Serrablo, hence the demonym "serrablese".
Sabiñánigo is at an altitude of 780 m and lies 52 km from Huesca.

It borders to the north the municipalities of Biescas and Yebra de Basa; to the east Fiscal and Boltaña; to the south on Las Peñas de Riglos; to the south-east the Somontano de Barbastro and to the west the municipalities of Caldearenas, Jaca and Villanúa.

Municipality villages 
Nowadays, what is known as the municipality of Sabiñánigo contains the following villages:

Abellada, Abenilla, Acumuer, Aineto, Alavés, Allué, Arguisal, Arraso, Arruaba, Arto, Artosilla, Aspés, Asqués, Asún, Atós Alto, Atós Bajo, Aurín, Bara, Baranguá, 
Belarra, Bentué de Nocito, Bolás, Borrés, Campares, Cañardo, Cartirana, Castiello de Guarga, Castillo de Lerés, Ceresola, Fablo, Fenillosa, Gésera, Gillué,  Grasa, Hostal de Ipiés, Ibirque, Ibort, Ipiés, Isín, Isún de Basa, Jabarrella, Laguarta, Lanave, Lárrede, Larrés, Lasaosa, Lasieso, Latas, Latrás, Layés, Molino de Escartín, Molino de Villobas, Ordovés, Orna de Gállego, Osán, Pardinilla, El Puente de Sabiñánigo, Rapún, Sabiñánigo Alto, San Esteban de Guarga, San Román de Basa, Sandiás, Santa María de Perula, Sardas, Sasal, Satué, Secorún, Senegüé, Solanilla, Sorripas, Used, Villacampa and Yéspola.

According to the 2004 census (INE), all of them together had a population of 977.

Geography 

Sabiñánigo is located between the valleys of the Aurín and Gállego rivers in the north and between the valleys of Basa and Guarga in the south. It covers an area from the Interior Range to the Exterior Range of The Pyrenees.

It has a large variety of ecosystems and landscapes, rich traditional architecture and modern facilities. In the late 1970s the city celebrated the 2000th anniversary of its foundation by the Romans.

Demography

Sports, Culture and Tourism 

Sabiñánigo has always been strongly linked to sport and, especially, to cycling. It is famous for holding "The Quebrantahuesos" es, one of the most important amateur cyclist races in the world. It is also a frequent start and finish point of the Vuelta a España.

Sabiñánigo is a great place to go skiing. It is 30 km from the Ski resort of Panticosa, 38 km from Formigal (the largest ski resort in Spain), 44 km from Candanchú, 47 km from Astún and 120 km from Cerler.

Some interesting places to visit are the Museo de Artes de Serrablo es, a museum that contains tools, clothes and all kinds of traditional objects of the region; and Pirenarium es, a theme park with a great collection of models of the Pyrenees range and the most famous buildings of Aragón.

Twin Cities

References

External links
Council of Sabiñánigo
Quebrantahuesos Cyclist Race
Amigos de Serrablo

 
Municipalities in the Province of Huesca